Andrew Nelson is a writer and professor living in New Orleans. He worked as a senior producer of Britannica.com, a creative director for Cyberflix, a visiting professor at Loyola University New Orleans, and a Public Relations and Social Media Account professional at Peter A. Mayer Advertising in New Orleans. Two computer games he developed for CyberFlix – Titanic: Adventure Out of Time (1996) and Dust: A Tale of the Wired West (1995) – were bestselling PC game and Macintosh Games of the Year. In 2007 he was awarded a Lowell Thomas Award for his work with the Society. He  is a writer-at-large for Salon, National Geographic Traveler, ReadyMade, The New York Times, Via magazine, Weekend Sherpa and San Francisco Magazine (which featured Nelson’s monthly history column).

Nelson is a Missouri School of Journalism Alumni.

Projects
Harlem Renaissance websites were developed by Andrew Nelson and Tom Michael as a spotlight for Encyclopædia Britannica Online, to promote the encyclopedia and to serve customers in schools by observing Black History Month. He developed the format for National Geographic Traveler’s award-winning "Insiders" series that uses social media to explore a travel destination. He ran a Twitter guided travel project for the National Geographic Society in 2010. The resultant story "Tweet Me in Miami" for National Geographic Traveler won the Folio Award for magazine writing in 2010. His  Twitter feed won a 2009 Public Relations Society of America award and endorsements from the Pritzker Military Library and CNN News.

Awards

Websites
 2000: Site of the Day, All About Oscar, Yahoo
 1999: Hot Site, Harlem, USA Today
 1999: Cool Site, Site of the Day, The Martini, Netscape
 1998: Blue Web'n educational award, Lost Secrets, Pacific Bell
 1998: Site of the Day, Clicking Anastasia, Yahoo

Games
 1998: Best Animation CD-ROM/Games, Titanic, Animation Magazine
 1997: Game of the Year, Titanic, MacHome Journal
 1996: Game of the Year, Dust, Macworld
 1994: Game of the Year, Jump Raven, Apple-Japan

Journalism
 2011: Folio Award, Silver. For magazine article "Tweet Me in Miami," National Geographic Traveler
 2007: Lowell Thomas Prize for Travel Writing; Client: National Geographic Traveler
 2004: Lowell Thomas Prize for Travel Writing; Client: National Geographic Traveler
 1997: Andrew Nelson: "20 to Watch in Multimedia", Daily Variety
 1987: Young Journalists winner, Rolling Stone

Public relations
 2011: Adrian Award (Platinum) for Public Relations (Client: The National World War II Museum), HSMAI
 2011: Adrian Award (Gold) for Public Relations (Client: The National World War II Museum), HSMAI
 2011: Adrian Award (Bronze) for Social Media (Client: The National World War II Museum), HSMAI
 2010: Silver Quill:, Merit Award for Twitter Campaign (Client: The National World War II Museum), International Association of Business Communicators
 2010: Public Relations Campaign for The Solomon Victory Theater Opening (Client: The National World War II Museum), Press Club of New Orleans
 2009: Silver Award for Twitter campaign (Client: The National World War II Museum), Public Relations Society of America

External links
 
 Recent works for Salon.com
 Interview on Gamasutra
 The Harlem Renaissance project description at GlobalSpec

Citation

Living people
American male writers
American video game producers
Year of birth missing (living people)
Video game writers